Rahasya Romancha is a Bengali web series. Initially conceived as a thriller movie, it was turned into a web series, streaming on the Bengali OTT platform Hoichoi. It is produced by Edgy Entertainment and directed by Abhirup Ghosh. Season 1 was released in August 2019, with Priyanka Sarkar, Rudranil Ghosh, Kanchan Mullick, Saayoni Ghosh and Biswanath Basu in the lead roles.

The second season was released in March 2020. Rudranil Ghosh plays a crime boss running an organization of hired killers. Rajdeep Gupta, Shaoli Chattopadhyay, and Kharaj Mukherjee also have lead roles.

The third season was released in November 2020. Where Saurav Das played a role of a private investigator with Cotard's Syndrome (a rare neuropsychiatric condition in which the patient denies existence of one's own body to the extent of delusions of immortality). Saayoni Ghosh, Kanchan Mallick, Rukma Roy, Saoli Chattopadhyay also played lead roles. This series has a cameo appearance of Rudranil Ghosh as Jhontu Da.

Episodes

Season 1 (2019)
On 9 August 2019, Hoichoi launched the first season of the Rahasya Romancha Series with 5 episodes. A review of the series in The Indian Express commented favourably on the actors' performances, but found the story lines largely predictable.

Episodes

Season 2 (2020)
Season 2 of the series was released on 13 March 2020.

Episodes

Season 3 (2020)
On 27 November 2020 hoichoi released the third season of the Rahasya Romancha Series with brand new six episodes. In this season Saurav das made his appearance by playing the role of an iconic character named 'Mora'.

Episodes

References

External links

Indian web series
2017 web series debuts
Bengali-language web series
Hoichoi original programming